George Snider (January 31, 1813 – June 23, 1885) was a Canadian official and political figure in  Ontario. He represented Grey North in the House of Commons of Canada as a Liberal member from 1867 to 1878.

He was born in Eglinton, Upper Canada in 1813, the son of Martin Snider, a United Empire Loyalist of German descent, and educated in Toronto. He was the agent for the sale of Crown Lands on the Toronto and Sydenham (later Owen Sound) Road from 1848 to 1854. He served as the first sheriff for Grey County from 1853 to 1863. In 1863, he was an unsuccessful candidate for a seat in the assembly for the Province of Canada. Snider was also mayor of Owen Sound.

In 1835, Snider married Jean Maughan. He died in Owen Sound at the age of 72.

References 

1813 births
1885 deaths
Members of the House of Commons of Canada from Ontario
Liberal Party of Canada MPs
Mayors of Owen Sound